Hartford Church of England High School is a voluntary aided Church of England secondary school on Neot Road in Hartford, Cheshire, for students aged between eleven and sixteen. The school has dual specialist college status in both languages and sports. The school performs to an above-average standard, particularly with ‘outstanding’ achievement in physical education, and above-average attainment at GCSE.

Location
Situated in the village of Hartford, Cheshire, Hartford High School educates students from the local villages of Barnton, Greenbank, Castle, Winnington, Weaverham, Cuddington and the local town, Northwich. The school has the capacity to cater for 1,050 students from the age of eleven through sixteen.

The school is a split-site school, with the two main buildings being the old 'West Building' and a new replacement building now on the West site.  In addition to the two main buildings, there is a Science & Administration Building located in the East site, and Music and Art Blocks located in the West site.

History 
The school was founded in 1978 by the merge of two single-sex schools under the name 'Hartford High School'. The school then became a voluntary aided Church of England secondary school at the end of the 2012 academic year. In this process, the school motto was changed to "Caritas et veritas" (love and truth) and the logo had a representation of a cross added to it.

Until the end of the 2019 academic year, the school was a split-site school, with the two main buildings being the 'West Building' and the 'East Building'. Located approximately 200 metres apart, the two buildings were linked by a secure path for students, separate to public realm areas. The 'East Building' has been replaced with a £7m new building on the West site. Upon demolishing the 'East Building' the school is now on one site with the exception of the small Science & Administration Building located on the East site.

References

Hartford High School A Specialist Languages and Sports College

External links

Ofsted web page

Secondary schools in Cheshire West and Chester
Church of England secondary schools in the Diocese of Chester
Voluntary aided schools in England